Dr B C Roy Institute of Medical Sciences & Research (also the hospital which a part of the institution is known as Dr. Syama Prasad Mookerjee Super Speciality Hospital) is a medical school and  research institute at Balarampur, outside IIT Kharagpur campus, Paschim Medinipur district,  West Bengal, India. It will start with a 400-bed multi-speciality hospital with specialities like Cardiac, Neurosurgery, Organ Transplantation, Oncology, Trauma and others. Beside this, it will be equipted with state-of-the art research facilities like Telemedicine, Tissue engineering, Bioelectronics etc. and expand to 750 bed capacity later. It is proposed to start with 50 undergraduate medical seats. The institute is supposed to be functional by end of 2018. The various research, academic and medical infrastructure planning is being jointly carried out by IIT Kharagpur and All India Institute of Medical Sciences, Delhi.

As per IIT Kharagpur, in the phase – I, the 400-Bed Super-Speciality hospital will be begin its journey by end of 2019.
The graduate and postgraduate medical courses are expected to start in the academic year 2021–22.

As per the institute, 10% of the beds would be free and 65% of the beds would be charged as per the rates in the central and state health insurance schemes. Plans are also in place to expand and include a nursing college and a school to train paramedical and technical experts.

During the COVID-19 lockdown in India, unoccupied hospital building served as the quarantine center for the inter-state travelers returning to West Bengal.

On 71st foundation day of IIT Kharagpur, Amit Khare, the Secretary,  Ministry of Education in Government of India, declared that the medical courses will start from November 2021.

As of today, the hospital has 160 general beds, 90 ICU beds and 10 child crib carriers, out of which 44 ICU beds were donated by Arjun Malhotra.

See also
List of institutions of higher education in West Bengal
School of Medical Science and Technology IIT Kharagpur

References

External links
 Official YouTube Video

Hospitals in West Bengal
Medical Council of India
Medical colleges in West Bengal
IIT Kharagpur
Kharagpur
Universities and colleges in Paschim Medinipur district
2018 establishments in West Bengal
Educational institutions established in 2018
Research institutes established in 2018